Punjab Public Service Commission may refer to:

 Punjab Public Service Commission (India), a government agency of the Indian state of Punjab
 Punjab Public Service Commission (Pakistan), a government agency of the Pakistani province of Punjab